Cricket in the United States is a sport played at the amateur, club, intercollegiate and international competition levels with little popularity, with 200,000 players (<1% of the population) across the country. Minor League Cricket is the highest level of domestic T20 cricket currently played in America, with T20 being the format of the game that much of the recent growth in American cricket is occurring in.

History

Cricket was played by British colonists in North America by the start of the 18th century. Archived references to cricket played in America date from 1709. A New York newspaper from 1739 contains an advertisement for cricket players and the first documented competition occurred in 1751 in Manhattan. According to William Byrd II's diary, cricket was played on the slave plantations of Virginia, including on his Westover estate among neighbors and slaves. By 1793, Dartmouth College students were playing cricket on the Green. 
Philadelphia was the crucible of North American cricket and remains so today. Haverford College formed a cricket team in 1833, generally accepted as the first cricket club exclusively for Americans. Haverford and the University of Pennsylvania formed a strong rivalry, with the first match played on May 7, 1864, believed to be start of the third-oldest intercollegiate sporting contest in America, after the 1852 Harvard-Yale crew and 1859 Amherst-Williams baseball matches. Haverford and Penn then proceeded to play each other for three consecutive years until 1869, when the Haverford faculty banned cricket away from their college grounds. From 1875 and through 1880, Haverford College, Columbia College and University of Pennsylvania fielded a varsity elevens, which played a few matches each year against each other and other club teams.

In 1881, Penn, Harvard College, Haverford College, Princeton College (then known as College of New Jersey), and Columbia College formed The Intercollegiate Cricket Association, which Cornell University later joined. During the 44 years that The Intercollegiate Cricket Association existed (1881 through 1924)  Penn won The Intercollegiate Cricket Association championship (the de facto national championship) 23 times (3 shared with Haverford and Harvard, 1 shared with Haverford and Cornell, and 1 shared with just Haverford), Haverford won such championship 19 times (3 shared with Penn and Harvard, 1 shared with Penn and Cornell, and 1 shared with Penn), and Harvard won it 6 times, none after 1899 (3 shared with Haverford and Penn).

In July 1895 an international cricket match between Canada and the United States was played on the Manheim grounds in Germantown section of Philadelphia with six of the United States team being Penn student athletes and, in September of that year, past and then current members of Penn's varsity cricket team played past and then current members of the English cricket teams of Oxford and Cambridge resulting in Penn defeating the Oxford-Cambridge team by one hundred runs. This was not surprising as in the last two and a half decades of the 19th century and first decade of the 20th century, Philadelphia was the center of cricket in the United States Cricket had gained in popularity among the upper class from their travels abroad and cricket clubs sprung up all across the Eastern Seaboard (even today Philadelphia still has three cricket clubs: the Philadelphia Cricket Club, the Merion Cricket Club and the Germantown Cricket Club).

The eleven-person team cricket familiar with Americans today took root most effectively at the St. George's Cricket Club, founded in 1838. Clubs from the United States (St. George's CC) and Canada participated in one of the first international cricket matches on record in 1844 in Bloomingdale Park in Manhattan.  Cricket received a significant amount of media coverage at the time. In the mid-19th century, the sport was played in approximately 125 cities in 22 states. Roughly 500 officially established clubs existed and it is probable that in 1860 there were 10,000 boys and men in America who had actively played the sport for at least a season.

St. George's CC employed Sheffield native Samuel Wright as its professional cricket playing groundsman. Wright's two sons, Harry and George, played for the United States XXII against the All England XI in 1859 in New York and Philadelphia. Both Wright brothers became renowned in baseball circles after they played for the Cincinnati Red Stockings, America's first professional baseball team. English cricket teams toured American regularly. Richard Daft's England side visited in 1869, when they played in New York and Philadelphia. Then with the spread of cricket to Boston, Lord Hawke's England XI played George Wright's New England Cricket XI at the Longwood Country Club in Boston. On the same tour in 1891 Lord Hawke's XI defeated a Germantown CC XI in Philadelphia, which included George Patterson, regarded as America's best batsman, with several centuries to his credit. George Patterson – referred to as America's W.G. Grace – was an American-born cricketer and lawyer by profession, described as brilliant under pressure when facing first-class English sides.

Governing bodies

The United States of America Cricket Association (USACA) previously served as the governing body for cricket in the United States, as an associate member of the ICC from 1965 to 2017. The USACA faced turmoil and governance issues in the 2000s and early 2010s. In 2005 the USACA was suspended from the ICC's annual conference due to issues with the association's election process, but that suspension was lifted in March 2006.  In February 2006, a competing commercial body, Major League Cricket (MLC), proposed that it replace the USACA as the United States' representative in the ICC, citing its more substantial efforts in developing the sport in the country (especially at grassroots levels such as schools, which the USACA had ignored), and accused the USACA of having "the morbid opinion that they do not need any outside assistance whereas the development of the game."

The USACA was suspended by the ICC in 2007 for its failure to adopt a constitution and hold elections in a timely manner, and the U.S. team pulled out of the World Cricket League Division Three. The organization was suspended once again in 2015, citing "significant concerns about the governance, finance, reputation and cricketing activities" of the organization. However, the U.S. team was still allowed to continue competing in events such as the 2015 ICC World Twenty20 Qualifier, with ICC Americas serving as an interim caretaker of its cricket operations. In 2017, the ICC voted to expel the USACA, citing its increasing debt and failure to ratify a certified constitution.

In January 2019,  a new body known as USA Cricket was approved as a new associate member of the ICC, replacing the USACA as the United States' representative.

National teams

Men's team 

In 2018, the U.S. men's team was promoted to Division Two of the World Cricket League for the first time. In 2019, the United States qualified for the inaugural season of its replacement, the ICC Cricket World Cup League 2, whose top teams will move on to the qualifier for the 2023 Cricket World Cup. On November 16, 2021, the ICC announced that the United States and West Indies would co-host the 2024 Men's T20 World Cup.

In December 2021, the United States hosted Ireland in a T20I and ODI series, which marked the country's first-ever home series against a Test-playing nation. The two teams split the T20 series. However, the ODI series was cancelled due to COVID-19 issues.

Women's team 

In November 2021, the United States won the 2021 Women's T20 World Cup Americas Qualifier, advancing to the global qualifier for the 2023 Women's T20 World Cup.

Domestic competitions
There have been various attempts at domestic cricket leagues in the United States: Pro Cricket was formed in 2004 as a commercial cricket league not sanctioned by the ICC, which played a modified T20 format with changes intended to further increase the pace of the game, including five-ball overs.  The USACA, later in partnership with New Zealand Cricket, proposed a T20 competition known as the American Premier League, patterned after competitions such as the Indian Premier League. It was announced in 2009, but never came to fruition. The American Twenty20 Championship was later held in 2011 as a three-day event in New Jersey between regional teams, to help develop and promote American players.

Via the investment arm American Cricket Enterprises (ACE), USA Cricket has sanctioned the domestic T20 league Minor League Cricket, and plans to launch the professional competition Major League Cricket (no relation to the aforementioned organization) in 2023.

International Competitions
On November 16, 2021, the International Cricket Council announced that the United States along with the West Indies will co-host the 2024 ICC Men's T20 World Cup, making the first ICC World Cup Tournament to take place in the United States.

Cricket grounds

There are only a few purpose-built cricket grounds in the United States, they include the Germantown Cricket Club Ground
and the Philadelphia Cricket Club Ground in Philadelphia, Pennsylvania, the Randolph St. George Walker Park on Staten Island, New York; the Central Broward Regional Park in Lauderhill, Florida; and the Leo Magnus Cricket Complex in Van Nuys, California.

The Indianapolis World Sports Park in Indianapolis, Indiana, which features cricket grounds, was completed in 2014, and hosted the USACA's national championship that year.

The game is also played on a number of shared purpose venues, they include Van Cortlandt Stadium in Bronx, New York and others.

The main cricket grounds in the United States include:
 Central Broward Regional Park in Lauderhill - Hosted 4 T20I since 2010. It is the home ground for the Ft. Lauderdale Lions in Minor League Cricket. It is also the only ICC-certified cricket stadium in the country.
 Leo Magnus Cricket Complex in Los Angeles - Hosted five List-A match between India-A and Australia-A in 1999. It is the home ground for the Hollywood Master Blasters and the SoCal Lashings.
 Indianapolis World Sports Park in Indianapolis - The facility is slated to open in 2014 and hosted the domestic season in 2014 and 2015
 Church Street Park in Morrisville - Home to the Morrisville Cardinals and hosted the 2021 Minor League Cricket season finals and under renovation by USA Cricket.
 Germantown Cricket Club Ground - Hosted few First-class matches
 Philadelphia Cricket Club Ground - Hosted few First-class matches
 Randolph St. George Walker Park

In 2021, American Cricket Enterprises leased AirHogs Stadium, the home field of the defunct Texas AirHogs baseball team, to redevelop it as a cricket-specific stadium and USA Cricket training facility.

Cricket in American culture

In 2006 it was estimated that 30,000 people in the United States play or watch cricket annually. By 2017, this figure had risen to 200,000 people playing cricket in 6,000 teams. Cricket in the United States is not as popular as baseball and is not as popular among as large a fraction of the population as it is within either the Commonwealth nations or the other ICC full member (or Test cricket) nations. There are at least two historical reasons for the relative obscurity of cricket within the United States. One reason was the 19th-century-rise of the summer time bat and ball sport now called baseball, which has displaced cricket as a popular pastime. Another reason was that in 1909 when the ICC was originally organized as the Imperial Cricket Conference it was open only to Commonwealth nations and thereby excluded the US from participating in the sport at the highest level.

Nevertheless, in 1965 the US was admitted to the renamed ICC as an associate member and the sport grew in popularity in the second half of the 20th century. An oft mentioned reason for the growing popularity of cricket is the growing population of immigrants to the US who come from cricket playing nations.

With the launching of the United States Youth Cricket Association in 2010, a more focused effort to bring the game to American schools was begun, with the intention of broadening cricket's fan base beyond expatriates and their children. In addition, USA Cricket has begun offering various championship tournaments for youth cricketers, such as the MLC Jr. Championship.

ESPN has been stepping up its coverage of cricket in recent years, buying the cricket website Cricinfo in 2007, and broadcasting the final of the 2014 ICC World Twenty20 competition, the 2014 Indian Premier League, English County Championship games, and international Test cricket.

Today, cricket in the United States is mostly played by those with heritage in countries where cricket is popular.  As of 2022, all members of the United States national cricket team were either born in countries which play Test Cricket, or were born in the U.S. to parents from such countries.  

Despite its lack of popularity, it is not uncommon to find clubs with a long history and a lineage dating back to the early 20th century.

See also
 United States national cricket team
 List of United States of America ODI cricketers
 List of United States national cricket captains
 NYPD Cricket League
 Comparison between cricket and baseball
 Compton Cricket Club
 History of United States cricket
 Cricket All-Stars, a 2015 T20 exhibition series played in America
 Indian cricket team in the West Indies and the United States in 2019
 Wicket (sport), a historical North American variant of cricket
 Major League Cricket
 Minor League Cricket

References